Verhaeghe may refer to:

Bart Verhaeghe, Belgian footballer and club president
Marie Tamarelle-Verhaeghe (born 1962), French Democratic Movement politician
Paul Verhaeghe (born 1955), Belgian clinical psychologist and psychoanalyst
Verhaeghe Brewery, Belgian brewery
Carter Verhaeghe (Born 1995), Canadian ice hockey centre for the Florida Panthers

See also
Paul Verhaeghen (born 1965), Belgian novelist
Verhaegen, different form of the surname

Dutch-language surnames
Surnames of Belgian origin
Toponymic surnames